John A. Buehrens (born 1947) is an American Unitarian Universalist minister and author.

Biography
Buehrens is a graduate of Harvard College and Harvard Divinity School.  

He was ordained in 1973 and served his first congregation in Knoxville, Tennessee. He then became Senior Minister of First Unitarian Church in Dallas in 1981 and following that, co-minister of the Unitarian Church of All Souls in New York City. He was then elected to become the sixth president of the Unitarian Universalist Association; he served from 1993 to 2001 and resided in the Boston area. Following that, from 2002 to 2012, Buehrens served as minister of First Parish in Needham, Massachusetts. He served as Interim Minister at the Unitarian Universalist Church of the Monterey Peninsula in Carmel, California. He served as Developmental Senior Minister of the First Unitarian Universalist Society of San Francisco but announced in December 2016 that he would be retiring from First Unitarian Universalist Society of San Francisco, effective June 2017.  

He received honorary doctorates from Starr King School of the Ministry in 1990 (Doctor of Sacred Theology), from Meadville Lombard Theological School in 1995 (Doctor of Divinity) and from the Federated Protestant Theological Faculty, Kolosvar (Cluj-Napoca), Romania in 2000 (Doctor of Sacred Theology.

Bibliography
Buehrens's published writings include the following:
The Uses of Memory (Voices of liberal religion), Rising Press, 1992
A Chosen Faith: An Introduction to Unitarian Universalism, with Forrest Church, Beacon Press, 1998 (revised),  (hardcover),  (paperback)
The Unitarian Universalist Pocket Guide, 3e, (editor), Skinner House Books, 1999, 
Understanding the Bible: An Introduction for Skeptics, Seekers, and Religious Liberals, Beacon Press, 2003,  (hardcover),  (paperback)
A House for Hope: The Promise of Progressive Religion for the Twenty-first Century, with Rebecca Parker, Beacon Press, 2010,  (hardcover),  (paperback)
Universalists and Unitarians in America : a people's history, Skinner House, 2011, 
Conflagration: How the Transcendentalists Sparked the American Struggle for Racial, Gender, and Social Justice, Beacon Press 2020, 
A Religious Center with a Civic Circumference: Unitarians in San Francisco Since 1850, First Unitarian Universalist Society of San Francisco, 2023,

References

External links
UUA  Rev. John A. Buehrens
Rev. John Buehrens / UUSF

American Unitarian Universalists
American religious leaders
Harvard Divinity School alumni
1947 births
Living people
Unitarian Universalist clergy
Harvard College alumni